Lomba da Fazenda is a parish in the municipality of Nordeste in the Azores. The population in 2011 was 844, in an area of 14.77 km². It contains the localities Lomba da Cruz, Conceição, Arraiado, Barreiros e Canada Francisco Duarte, Leira, R. Dr. Man. João da Silveira e Canada do Cristiano, Vale, Outeiro, Almas and Termo.

References

Bibliography
Atlântico Nordeste. Migrações

Freguesias of Nordeste, Azores